WNBA Top 20@20 are the Women's National Basketball Association's Top 20 Players of All Time, chosen in 2016 on the occasion of the twentieth season of the WNBA from amongst 60 nominees compiled by the league. The group was to comprise the 20 best and most influential players of the first twenty years of the WNBA, with consideration also accorded to sportsmanship, community service, leadership, and contribution to the growth of women's basketball; only players to have competed in the WNBA for at least two seasons, and fit at least three of seven criteria (WNBA championship, major individual award, a selection to either the All-WNBA Team, WNBA All-Defensive Team, or WNBA All-Star Game; a current ranking among the top 30 statistical career leaders; and a selection to either the WNBA's All-Decade Team or the WNBA's Top 15 Players of All Time) were considered.

The Top 20 players were announced on June 21, 2016 at ESPN's SportsCenter. Dawn Staley was the only member of both the WNBA's All-Decade Team (2006) and the WNBA's Top 15 Players of All Time (2011) absent from the Top 20 list.

Players selected
Note: all information only pertains to the first twenty years of the league's existence.

The inaugural WNBA All-Star Game took place during the 1999 season, and the game has been contested in most years since. The 2004 edition was supplanted by a game between WNBA players from both conferences and the 2004 United States Olympic team, and the 2010 edition was a game between WNBA players from both conferences and the USA National Team. For the purposes of this article, appearances in the 2004 and 2010 games for both participating teams are considered All-Star appearances. This differs from the WNBA's practice, which does not count Team USA players in 2004 and 2010 as All-Stars, even though all members of Team USA except for Maya Moore in 2010 were WNBA players at the time of the two games. From 2008 through 2020, no All-Star Game was held in any Summer Olympic year. With the 2020 Summer Olympics being delayed to 2021 due to COVID-19, the league held an exhibition shortly before it took a break for the Olympics, with a WNBA all-star team taking on the USA national team. Unlike the analogous 2004 event, the 2021 game was officially treated as an All-Star Game.
Players who were voted to start in all-star games but were unable to play due to injury are nevertheless considered to have been starters; players voted as reserves who started in place of other injured players are nevertheless considered to have been reserves.

Other finalists

Janeth Arcain5
Alana Beard1
Ruthie Bolton3
DeWanna Bonner1
Rebekkah Brunson1
Tina Charles1
Elena Delle Donne1
Érika de Souza1
Skylar Diggins1
Tamecka Dixon5
Katie Douglas6
Candice Dupree1
Margo Dydek7
Cheryl Ford6
Sylvia Fowles1
Jennifer Gillom5
Brittney Griner1
Chamique Holdsclaw3
Shannon Johnson4
Vickie Johnson5
Crystal Langhorne1
Kara Lawson
Betty Lennox
Mwadi Mabika5
Angel McCoughtry1
Taj McWilliams-Franklin4
DeLisha Milton-Jones4
Nneka Ogwumike1
Wendy Palmer
Plenette Pierson1
Nicole Powell
Ruth Riley
Danielle Robinson1
Nykesha Sales4
Tangela Smith6
Dawn Staley2
Nikki Teasley
Penny Taylor1, 6
Natalie Williams4
Sophia Young

1 Still active at time of Top 20 Team announcement.
2 Was in both the All-Decade and Top 15 teams.
3All-Decade honorable mention, Top 15 nominee.
4Nominated for both All-Decade and Top 15 teams.
5All-Decade nominee.
6Top 15 nominee.
7Deceased.

References

External links
Official announcement on WNBA.com

Lists of Women's National Basketball Association players
2016 WNBA season